Helen Meinardi (1909-1997) was an American screenwriter and songwriter who wrote a string of films in the 1930s.

Biography 
Helen was born in Chicago, Illinois, to Garrett Meinardi and Sarah Henderson. Her parents separated when she was young, and her father won custody; however, Sarah briefly kidnapped Helen and Helen's younger sister, Ruth.

She attended the Lucy Cobb Finishing School in Georgia as a young woman before graduating from Indiana University. After college, she worked in New York City for a time before heading to Los Angeles, determined to forge a career for herself in Hollywood.

Helen began writing songs and screenplays in the 1930s; she wrote a number of songs for musician Hoagy Carmichael, who eventually became her brother-in-law. Helen won an RKO contract after writing the story that inspired the 1937 film I Met Him in Paris. In her later years, she worked as a journalist for CBS in New York before retiring to Maine.

Selected filmography 

 Cross-Country Romance (1940)
 Next Time I Marry (1938)
 Maid's Night Out (1938)
 I Met Him in Paris (1937)
 Our Blushing Brides (1930)

References 

Screenwriters from Illinois
American women screenwriters
Writers from Chicago
Indiana University alumni
1909 births
1997 deaths
20th-century American women writers
20th-century American screenwriters